Regina Chukwu is a Nigerian actress , film producer and director.

Early life and education 
Regina Chukwu was born in Lagos.She attended Alimosho Primary and Grammar School before she later proceeded to Lagos State Polytechnic.

Filmography 
 Ogunso
 Idaro
 Akun
 Ewatomi
 Bridal Shower
 Encounter
 Two Mothers
 Family Ties

Awards and nominations

References 

Living people
Nigerian film actresses
Nigerian film award winners
Actresses in Yoruba cinema
Lagos State Polytechnic alumni
Nigerian film producers
Nigerian women film producers
Nigerian women film directors
21st-century Nigerian actresses
Yoruba actresses
Year of birth missing (living people)
Actresses from Lagos